Rüppell's warbler (Curruca ruppeli) is a typical warbler of the genus Curruca. It breeds in Greece, Turkey and neighbouring islands. It is  migratory, wintering in northeast Africa. This is a rare vagrant to western Europe. The name is occasionally cited as "Rueppell's warbler".

It is a typical "Curruca" warbler, similar in size but slimmer than the Sardinian warbler. The adults have a plain grey back and paler grey underparts. The bill is fine and pointed, with brown legs and red eyes. The striking male has a black head and, usually, a black throat, separated by a white malar streak ("moustache"). Females have a pale throat, and the head is grey rather than black. Their grey back has a brownish tinge. The song is a slower, deeper rattle than that of the Sardinian warbler.

Together with the Cyprus warbler it forms a superspecies with dark throats, white malar streaks and light remigial fringes. This in turn is related to the species of Mediterranean and Middle East Sylvia warblers that have a naked eye-ring, namely the eastern subalpine warbler, Sardinian warbler and Ménétries's warbler. Both groups have a white malar area, but this may not form a clear streak in the latter group; above the white, the heads of males are uniformly dark.

These small insectivorous passerine birds are found in thick thorny shrubs where they build their nests and lay four to six eggs.

The English name and the specific ruppeli commemorate the German zoologist and explorer Eduard Rüppell (1794–1884).

References

Rüppell's warbler
Birds of Europe
Birds of Western Asia
Rüppell's warbler